Lifestyles of Health and Sustainability (LOHAS) is a demographic defining a particular market segment related to sustainable living, "green" ecological initiatives, and generally composed of a relatively upscale and well-educated population segment. The author Paul H. Ray, who coined the term Cultural Creatives in his book by the same name, explains that "What you're seeing is a demand for products of equal quality that are also virtuous." Included in the cultural creative demographic are consumers of New Age goods and services.

Researchers have reported a range of sizes of the LOHAS market segment. For example, Worldwatch Institute reported that the LOHAS market segment in the year 2006 was estimated at $300 billion, approximately 30% of the U.S. consumer market; and, a study by the Natural Marketing Institute showed that in 2007, 41 million or 13% of the Americans were included within the LOHAS psychographic. In Japan roughly 17 million adults or 12% of the population are LOHAS consumers.

Products and services 

The marketplace includes goods and services such as:
 Organic and locally grown food
 Organic and natural personal care products
 Hybrid and electric cars as well as city bicycles
 Green and sustainable building
 Sustainable or Ecotourism
 Energy efficient electronics/appliances
 Socially responsible investing
 Natural household products (paper goods and cleaning products)
 Complementary, alternative and preventive medicine (Naturopathy, Chinese medicine, etc.)
 Fair trade products
 Literature in the Mind/Body/Soul, Holistic Health, and New Age genres

See also 

 Green marketing
 Natural Capitalism
 Simple living – Sometimes called LOVOS, Lifestyles of Voluntary Simplicity
 Sustainable business
 Triple bottom line

References

External links 
 LOHASwire.com Canadian news wire agency specializing in LOHAS
 The Source Asia Hong Kong based Online Magazine focused on LOHAS and Holistic living.
 LOHAS and The Indigo Dollar: Growing The Spiritual Economy Article critical of LOHAS' mobilization of spirituality.

Sustainable products